Cosmin is a masculine Romanian given name of Greek origin. Notable people with the name include:

Cosmin Băcilă (born 1983), Romanian footballer
Cosmin Bărcăuan (born 1978), Romanian footballer
Cosmin Bodea (born 1973), Romanian footballer and manager
Cosmin Chetroiu (born 1987), Romanian luger
Cosmin Ciocoteală (born 1997), Romanian footballer
Cosmin Contra (born 1975), Romanian footballer and manager
Cosmin Frăsinescu (born 1985), Romanian footballer
Cosmin Gârleanu (born 1989), Romanian footballer
Cosmin Gherman (born 1984), Romanian futsal player
Cosmin Hănceanu (born 1986), Romanian fencer
Cosmin Cristian Iancu (born 1987), Romanian artistic gymnast
Cosmin Malita (born 1989), Romanian artistic gymnast
Cosmin Mărginean (born 1978), Romanian footballer
Cosmin Matei (born 1991), Romanian footballer
Cosmin Moți (born 1984), Romanian footballer
Cosmin Muj (born 1988), Romanian aerobic gymnast
Cosmin Năstăsie (born 1983), Romanian footballer
Cosmin Olăroiu (born 1969), Romanian footballer and manager
Cosmin Paşca, Romanian sprint canoeist
Cosmin Pașcovici (born 1978), Romanian footballer
Cosmin Alin Popescu (born 1974), Romanian rector of the  Banat University of Agricultural Sciences and Veterinary Medicine (USABTM)
Cosmin Popescu (gymnast) (born 1987), Romanian artistic gymnast
Cosmin Radu (born 1981), Romanian water polo player
Cosmin Rațiu (born 1979), Romanian rugby union player
Cosmin Tilincă (born 1980), Romanian footballer
Cosmin Vancea (born 1984), Romanian footballer
Cosmin Vâtcă (born 1982), Romanian footballer

See also
Cozmin Gușă (born 1970), Romanian politician

Romanian masculine given names